Laredo Ranchettes West is a census-designated place (CDP) in Webb County, Texas, United States. This was a new CDP formed from parts of the Laredo Ranchettes CDP prior to the 2010 census. Although a new CDP the population was listed as zero.

Geography
Laredo Ranchettes West is located at  (27.490034, -99.370145).

Education
Residents are in the United Independent School District. Zoned schools include: Freedom Elementary School, Raul Perales Middle School, and United South High School.

The designated community college for Webb County is Laredo Community College.

References

Census-designated places in Webb County, Texas
Census-designated places in Texas